The Tall Headlines is a 1950 thriller novel by the British writer Audrey Erskine Lindop. A middle-class British family are lest devastated and divided when the eldest son is arrested and hanged for murder.

In 1952 it was adapted into a film of the same title directed by Terence Young and starring Mai Zetterling.

References

Bibliography
 Goble, Alan. The Complete Index to Literary Sources in Film. Walter de Gruyter, 1999.
 Vinson, James. Twentieth-Century Romance and Gothic Writers. Macmillan, 1982.

1950 British novels
Novels by Audrey Erskine Lindop
British thriller novels
British novels adapted into films
Heinemann (publisher) books